The 2015–16 West of Scotland Super League Premier Division was the fourteenth Super League Premier Division competition since the formation of the Scottish Junior Football Association, West Region in 2002. The winners of this competition are eligible to enter round one of the 2016–17 Scottish Cup. The two last placed sides are relegated to the Super League First Division. The third-bottom placed side will enter the West Region league play-off, a two-legged tie against the third placed side in the Super League First Division, to decide the final promotion/relegation spot.

Auchinleck Talbot won the championship on 25 May 2016, claiming a record fifth West of Scotland Super Premier League title.

Member clubs for the 2015–16 season
Auchinleck Talbot were the reigning champions.

Pollok and Shettleston were promoted from the Super League First Division, replacing the automatically relegated Clydebank and Cumnock Juniors.

Kirkintilloch Rob Roy claimed a third promotion spot after defeating Shotts Bon Accord in the West Region League play-off.

1 Groundsharing with Cumbernauld United F.C.

Managerial changes

League table

Results

West Region League play-off
Kilwinning Rangers, who finished third in the Super League First Division, defeated Shettleston 5–3 on aggregate in the West Region League play-off. Kilwinning will replace Shettleston in the 2016–17 West of Scotland Super League Premier Division.

References

6
SJFA West Region Premiership seasons